The 2016 Coates Hire Sydney 500 was a motor racing event for the Supercars Championship held on the weekend of 2 to 4 December 2016. The event was held at the Homebush Street Circuit in Sydney Olympic Park, New South Wales, and consisted of two races of 250 kilometres in length. It was the final round of the 2016 International V8 Supercars Championship, and the final time that the venue hosted a Supercar race, being replaced by the Newcastle Street Circuit from 2017 onwards.

Report

Practice

Race results

Race 28

Qualifying 

Notes:
 — David Reynolds' team exceeded parc fermé regulations after qualifying, which resulted in the exclusion of Reynolds.

Race

Race 29

Qualifying

Top Ten Shootout

Race

Championship standings after the event 

Drivers' Championship standings

Teams' Championship standings

References

Coates Hire Sydney 500
Motorsport in Sydney
Coates Hire Sydney 500